Basilio Puoti (27 July 1782, Naples – 19 July 1847, Naples) was an Italian literary critic, lexicographer and grammarian.

Life
From a noble family of the marquisate level, he was descended from Re Adelchi, son of Re Desiderio. He graduated in jurisprudence in 1809. He became the inspector general of public education for the Kingdom of Two Sicilies and then left that post to set up and teach in an Italian-language school in one of the palazzi in Naples in 1825. Its students included Luigi Settembrini and Francesco De Sanctis.

He opposed all the "barbari" (barbarians) or Romantic poets except Alessandro Manzoni, whose nationalist sentiments he shared. Puoti was instead a purist, more open regarding the Italian lexicon but advocating strict imitation of 15th and 16th century models when it came to style. He translated Greek and Latin and was a member of the Accademia della Crusca.

Selected works
Regole elementari della lingua italiana – 1833 (online l'ed. lucchese del 1850)
Dello studio delle scienze e delle lettere – 1833
 Della maniera di studiare la lingua e l'eloquenza italiana – 1837 (online l'ed. fiorentina del 1838)
Vocabolario domestico napoletano-toscano – 1841 (online)
L'arte di scrivere in prosa per esempii e per teoriche – 1843 (online l'ed. fiorentina del 1857)
Dizionario dei francesismi 1845.

References

Bibliography 
 La giovinezza di Francesco De Sanctis, autobiographical fragment published by Pasquale Villari, Morano, Napoli 1924.
 S. Baldacchini, Di Puoti e della lingua italiana, in "Rendiconti dell'Accademia di archeologia, lettere e belle arti", vol. II, 1866, pp. 89–148

External links (in Italian) 
 Scheda (online) del Sistema Bibliotecario Nazionale
 (online) dell'Enciclopedia Treccani
 
 

18th-century Neapolitan people
1782 births
1847 deaths
Latin–Italian translators
Greek–Italian translators
Grammarians of Italian
Italian lexicographers
Italian literary critics
19th-century Neapolitan people
19th-century translators
19th-century lexicographers